Don't Be Afraid is a 1997 album by electro-dance group Information Society. The album adds industrial elements and guitars. The album was recorded with Kurt Harland remaining the sole member of the band, featuring collaborators Fred Maher and Steve Siebold of HateDept.. The album features a more conceptual sound unlike past material, with Harland describing the album's themes as "extremes of emotion and sensation."

Background 
According to Kurt's Insoc.org website, the oldest work on the album is the first version of closing in, which dates back to 1992. Most tracks on the album have had previous iterations and versions, with these tracks being updated over the years. Harland initially worked with Fred Maher in 1996 on some of the very first tracks of the album. Steve Seibold of Hate Dept. joined in January 1997 taking Maher's place and collaborated by playing guitar, producing and mixing on a number of tracks. This album is the first and only Information Society album to feature guitars, which are used on several tracks.

Track listing

Other releases

 Accession Records released a version of the album featuring different artwork and inserts in 1999.
 The album was remastered and re-released on April 1, 2008, as a digital download in the iTunes and Amazon music stores.

Personnel

Information Society 
 Kurt Harland – vocals, programming

Guests 
 Fred Maher – guitar on track 5
 Steven Seibold – guitar on tracks 2, 3, 4, and 9, drums on tracks 2, 6, and 9, programming
 Rachel Girard – vocals on track 6

Production
Tracks 1, 2, 3, 4, 6, and 9 produced and mixed by Steven Seibold, recorded at Seibold Studios.
Tracks 5 and 7 produced and mixed by Fred Maher, recorded at Fred Maher's studio.
Tracks 8, 10 and 11 produced and mixed by Kurt Harland, recorded in KurtsCar.

References

External links
 [ Allmusic]
 Official site by Kurt Harland
 InSoc Brasil, on the Brazilian release (in Portuguese)

Information Society (band) albums
1997 albums
Albums produced by Fred Maher
Cleopatra Records albums